Francesco Gonzaga O.F.M. Obs. (died 2 March 1620) was a Roman Catholic prelate who served as Bishop of Mantua (1593–1620), Apostolic Nuncio to France (1596–1599), Bishop of Pavia (1593), and Bishop of Cefalù (1587–1593).

Early life
He was born as fifth son of Carlo Gonzaga, Marquis of Gazzuolo, Count of San Martino and his wife Emilia Cauzzi Gonzaga, natural daughter of Federico II Gonzaga, Duke of Mantua by his lover Isabella Boschetti.

Biography
Francesco Gonzaga was ordained a priest in the Order of Observant Friars Minor.
On 26 October 1587, he was appointed during the papacy of Pope Sixtus V as Bishop of Cefalù. 
On 15 November 1587, he was consecrated bishop by Alessandro Andreasi, Bishop of Mantova, with Jacopo Roveglio, Bishop of Feltre, and Matteo Brumani, Titular Bishop of Nicomedia, serving as co-consecrators. 
On 29 January 1593, he was appointed during the papacy of Pope Clement VIII as Bishop of Pavia.
On 30 April 1593, he was appointed during the papacy of  Pope Clement VIII as Bishop of Mantova. 
On 10 May 1596, he was names Apostolic Nuncio to France; he served in this position until 1599.
He served as Bishop of Mantova until his death on 2 March 1620.

Episcopal succession
While bishop, he was the principal co-consecrator of:
Juan Corrionero, Bishop of Catania (1589); 
Carlo Bescapè, Bishop of Novara (1593); 
Jérôme de Langue, Bishop of Couserans (1593); and 
François Martinengo, Bishop of Nice (1600).

References

External links and additional sources
 (for Chronology of Bishops) 
 (for Chronology of Bishops) 
 (for Chronology of Bishops) 
 (for Chronology of Bishops) 
 (for Chronology of Bishops) 
 (for Chronology of Bishops) 
 (for Chronology of Bishops) 
 (for Chronology of Bishops) 

16th-century Italian Roman Catholic bishops
17th-century Italian Roman Catholic bishops
Bishops appointed by Pope Sixtus V
Bishops appointed by Pope Clement VIII
Bishops of Mantua
1620 deaths
Observant Franciscan bishops
Apostolic Nuncios to France